Catherine Chalmers (born 1957), is an American artist and photographer. She lives and works in New York City.

Biography 
Catherine Chalmers was born in 1957 in San Mateo, California. Chalmers graduated from Stanford University with a B.S. degree in Engineering in 1979, and from the Royal College of Art, with an M.F.A. degree in Painting.

She has exhibited at MASS MoCA, Corcoran Gallery of Art, Yerba Buena Center for the Arts, Museum of Contemporary Photography, the University Art Museum of CSU Long Beach; and Boise Art Museum.

Her work has appeared in the New York Times, ArtNews, Blind Spot, Harper's, and Discover. Her work has been featured on PBS, and This American Life.

Awards
2008, Jury Award (Best Experimental Short) for her film "Safari", SXSW Film Festival.
2010, Guggenheim Fellowship, in video and audio.
2018, Best Environmental Short for her film "Leafcutters", Natourale Film Festival, Wiesbaden, Germany.
2019, Gil Omenn Art & Science Award, Ann Arbor Film Festival.
2019, Best Experimental Film, The Earth Day Film Festival.

Films

Books

References

External links
Artist website

"Ecotopia", International Center of Photography

American photographers
1957 births
Living people
Stanford University School of Engineering alumni
Alumni of the Royal College of Art
American women photographers
People from San Mateo, California
Artists from New York City
21st-century American women